Lingula is Latin for "little tongue". It can stand for:

 Lingula (brachiopod), a brachiopod genus of the family Lingulidae, which is among the few brachiopods surviving today but also known from fossils over 500 million years old
 Lingala language, a Bantu language
 In anatomy:
 the Lingula of left lung, one of the segments of the left lung with a tongue-shape
 The Sphenoidal lingula, a part of the sphenoid bone
 The Lingula of mandible, a ridge on the medial aspect of the body of the mandible, just anterior to the mandibular foramen
 the Lingula of cerebellum
 Taenia of fourth ventricle
 In the vasiform orifice of the Aleyrodidae a small, tongue-like organ assisting in the excretion of honeydew